"Ain't Worried About Nothin'" is a song by American rapper French Montana for his debut studio album Excuse My French (2013). It was released on April 15, 2013, as the third single from the album. The song was written and produced by Rico Love and Earl & E, with additional songwriting provided by Montana. "Ain't Worried About Nothin'" peaked at number 63 on the U.S. Billboard Hot 100. An accompanying music video was released on May 7, 2013.

An official remix of "Ain't Worried About Nothin'" was released on October 4, 2013; it features rappers Rick Ross, Diddy and Snoop Dogg. An additional remix featuring recording artist Miley Cyrus was premiered online on October 14.

Music video
A music video was filmed in late April and released on May 7, 2013, for the song. Rappers Rick Ross, DJ Khaled and Sean Combs make cameo appearances in the video.

Remixes
A video posted by Montana previewed the song and revealed that Miley Cyrus was to be featured on the remix. Then the first official remix was released on October 4, 2013, featuring Rick Ross, Diddy and Snoop Dogg. Then, on October 14, 2013, the remix featuring Miley Cyrus was released.

On June 17, 2013, a remix by DJ Skee was released featuring verses by West Coast rappers Game, Dizzy Wright, Crooked I and Problem.

Charts

Weekly charts

Year-end charts

Certifications

References

2013 singles
2013 songs
French Montana songs
Bad Boy Records singles
Songs written by Rico Love
Song recordings produced by Rico Love
Songs written by Earl Hood
Songs written by Eric Goudy
Songs written by French Montana